Jeremy Richard Percy Heath (born 26 April 1959) is a former English cricketer.  Heath was a left-handed batsman.  He was born at Turners Hill, Sussex.

Heath made his first-class debut for Sussex against Yorkshire in the 1980 County Championship.  He made sixteen further first-class appearances for the county, the last of which came against Warwickshire in the 1983 County Championship.  In his seventeen first-class matches, he scored a total of 611 runs at an average of 22.62, with a high score of 101 not out.  This score was his only first-class century and came against the touring Sri Lankans in 1981.  Heath also made three List A appearances for Sussex, two in the 1980 John Player League against Yorkshire and Hampshire, and one in the 1981 John Player League against Nottinghamshire.  He scored a total of 37 runs in these three matches, at an average of 18.50, with a high score of 33.

References

External links
Jeremy Heath at ESPNcricinfo
Jeremy Heath at CricketArchive

1959 births
Living people
People from Turners Hill
English cricketers
Sussex cricketers